Charles Garner was a footballer who played one game for Burslem Port Vale in December 1892.

Career
Garner joined Burslem Port Vale of the Football League Second Division in November 1892. His only match at the Athletic Ground was in the Football League record 10–0 demolishing by Sheffield United on 10 December. He was released at the end of the season.

Career statistics
Source:

References

Year of birth missing
Year of death missing
English footballers
Association football forwards
Port Vale F.C. players
English Football League players